Lars Ricard Persson (born August 24, 1969) is a Swedish professional ice hockey player. Persson played in the NHL with the New Jersey Devils, St. Louis Blues, and Ottawa Senators.

Playing career
Persson was drafted by the New Jersey Devils in the 2nd round, 23rd overall in the 1987 NHL Entry Draft. Rather than join the Devils though Persson chose to stay in his native Sweden where he played in the Elitserien where played for eight seasons, six with Leksands IF and two with Malmö IF. The 1994–1995 season finally saw Persson arrive to North America when he joined the Albany River Rats of the AHL for the playoffs after finishing the regular season in Sweden.

Persson then played the majority of the following season with the River Rats but also made his NHL debut with the Devils, appearing in 12 games. The 1996–1997 season saw Persson start the year off with the River Rats, along with one game with the Devils, before he was traded to the St. Louis Blues. With the Blues Persson had a chance to crack the starting lineup. He played the majority of his NHL career with the Blues but thanks to injuries and numerous stints with the Blues minor league affiliate Worcester IceCats never played more than 54 games in a season.  He recorded the primary assist of a series winning goal during the first overtime of game 7 of the Blues' first round matchup against the Phoenix Coyotes in 1999 when his shot from the top of the faceoff circle was deflected into the net by Pierre Turgeon.

Prior to the 2000–2001 season Persson signed as a free agent with the Ottawa Senators. During his first year though he missed the majority of the games due to an ankle injury, and the following season he was a healthy reserve for the majority of the season. After taking a foolish penalty for a check on Tie Domi, he was widely blamed for the Senators' losing a playoff series to the Toronto Maple Leafs, and ending the Senators hope for a Stanley Cup that season.

Following his two years with the Senators, Persson played in Germany with Eisbären Berlin for three years. He then played in Austria for EC KAC before joining the Oji Eagles of the Asia League Ice Hockey, spending two seasons with each team. He would play one more season afterwards in Italy for SG Cortina before retiring.

Career statistics

Regular season and playoffs

International

References

External links
 

1969 births
Living people
Albany River Rats players
SG Cortina players
Eisbären Berlin players
EC KAC players
Leksands IF players
Malmö Redhawks players
Minnesota Wild scouts
New Jersey Devils draft picks
New Jersey Devils players
Oji Eagles players
Ottawa Senators players
People from Östersund
St. Louis Blues players
Swedish ice hockey defencemen
Worcester IceCats players
Sportspeople from Jämtland County